Gavin Rothery is a British screenwriter, director and designer. He wrote and directed the 2020 science fiction film Archive, and was the conceptual designer / head of graphic design on 2009 film Moon.

References

External links
gavinrothery.com

Living people
Year of birth missing (living people)
British screenwriters
British film directors